Ewa Serwa (born 7 October 1956) is a Polish actress. She has appeared in more than 45 films and television shows since 1978.

Selected filmography
 Uczennica ("Schoolgirl") (1982), as Anna Hinelowna
 Na Wspólnej (2003)
 Life Feels Good (2013)

References

External links

1956 births
Living people
Polish film actresses
Actresses from Kraków